Al Dhafra Air Base  is a military installation in the United Arab Emirates.

Facilities

Role and operations

United Arab Emirates Air Force
The air base is the headquarters of the Western Air Command of the United Arab Emirates Air Force. It hosts the UAE Air Force Fighter Wing, comprising the 1st Shaheen Squadron, 2nd Shaheen Squadron, and 3rd Shaheen Squadron which is equipped with the Lockheed Martin F-16E/F Desert Falcon). The base is also home to the 71st and 76th Fighter Squadrons which operate the Dassault Mirage 2000-9EAD/DAD.

Military intervention against ISIL

United States

Al Dhafra hosts the United States Air Force's 380th Air Expeditionary Wing (380 AEW), established at the base on 25 January 2002. The 380 AEW's mission is to carry out combat operations to provide high-altitude all-weather intelligence, surveillance, reconnaissance, airborne command and control and aerial refueling for military operations against ISIL/ISIS (referred to by the US military as Operation Inherent Resolve) and previously, NATO-led operations in Afghanistan (Operation Resolute Support). The wing is known to have operated the F-15C Eagle, F-15E Strike Eagle, F-22A Raptor, KC-10A Extender, E-3 Sentry (AWACS) U-2S Dragon Lady and EQ-4 and RQ-4 Global Hawk. The first USAF F-35 Lightning II deployed to the Middle East was deployed to Al Dhafra Air Base in April 2019.

While the US military presence at the base dates back to the early 1990s, it was only officially acknowledged by the US Air Force in August 2017.

As of 2020, contractor activity at Al Dhafra on behalf of the US military includes work done by Abacus Technology Corp. information technology, Centurum information technology, in addition to various construction projects.

France

On 1 September 2008, the French Air Force opened its own military settlement in the northwest corner of the base, operating Dassault Mirage 2000-5Fs.

With military operations against ISIL/ISIS, the French also deployed Breguet Atlantique II maritime patrol aircraft as part of Opération Chammal.

Based units
Notable units based at Al Dhafra Air Base.

United Arab Emirates Air Force
Western Air Command

 Fighter Wing
 71 Squadron – Mirage 2000-9EAD/9DAD
 76 Squadron – Mirage 2000-9EAD/9DAD
 1st Shaheen Squadron – F-16E/F Desert Falcon
 2nd Shaheen Squadron – F-16E/F Desert Falcon
 3rd Shaheen Squadron – F-16E/F Desert Falcon

French Air and Space Force
(Al Dhafra 'Lieutenant-Colonel Charles Pijeaud' Air Base)
 Escadron de Chasse 1/7 Provence with the Dassault Rafale from June 2016
 Previously:
 Escadron de Chasse 1/2 Cigognes with the Dassault Mirage 2000-5F (2008-2010)
 Escadron de Chasse 3/30 Lorraine with the Rafale (2010-2016)

United States Air Force
Air Combat Command

 US Air Forces Central Command
 Air Forces Central Air Warfare Center
 380th Air Expeditionary Wing
 380th Expeditionary Operations Group
 Various Expeditionary Fighter Squadrons – F-15C Eagle, F-15E Strike Eagle, F-22 Raptor, F-35A Lightning II
 99th Expeditionary Reconnaissance Squadron – U-2 Dragon Lady
 380th Expeditionary Operations Support Squadron
 908th Expeditionary Air Refueling Squadron – KC-10A Extender
 968th Expeditionary Airborne Air Control Squadron – E-3 Sentry
 380th Air Expeditionary Maintenance Group
 380th Expeditionary Aircraft Maintenance Squadron
 380th Expeditionary Maintenance Squadron
 380th Air Expeditionary Mission Support Group
 380th Expeditionary Civil Engineer Squadron
 380th Expeditionary Communications Squadron
 380th Expeditionary Contracting Squadron
 380th Expeditionary Force Support Squadron
 380th Expeditionary Logistics Readiness Squadron
 380th Expeditionary Security Forces Squadron
 380th Air Expeditionary Medical Squadron
 1st Expeditionary Civil Engineer Group
 577th Expeditionary Prime BEEF Squadron
 557th Expeditionary RED HORSE Squadron

The 380th AEW is also known to operate the EQ-4B and RQ-4B Global Hawk.

United States Army
US Army Forces Command

 32nd Army Air and Missile Defense Command
 11th Air Defense Artillery Brigade
 43rd Air Defense Artillery Regiment
 1st Battalion – MIM-104 Patriot

Attacks against the base
On 24 January 2022, Al Dhafra Air Base was targeted by Houthi Zulfiqar ballistic missiles in retaliation for UAE involvement in the ongoing Yemeni Civil War. Two missiles aimed at the base were intercepted and destroyed by US Patriot missiles, coincident to efforts by the United Arab Emirates Armed Forces.

References

External links
 Al Dhafra Air Base at GlobalSecurity.org
 
 Al Dhafra Air Base at OSGEOINT

United Arab Emirates Air Force bases
French Air and Space Force bases
Installations of the United States Air Force
France–United Arab Emirates relations
United Arab Emirates–United States relations